Theodore Marston (August 10, 1868 in Minnesota – October 2, 1920 in Los Angeles, California, United States) was an American silent film director and writer during the early silent period. He directed films including Aurora Floyd in 1912 and worked with actors such as William Garwood and Harry Benham.

Selected filmography
 She (1911)
 The Last of the Mohicans (1911)
 David Copperfield (1911) recent research disputes that Marston directed this film
 Put Yourself in His Place (1912)
 Aurora Floyd (1912)
 Robin Hood (1913)
 The Battle of Frenchman's Run (1915)
 The Caveman (1915)
 The Wheels of Justice (1915)
 The Surprises of an Empty Hotel (1916)
 The Secret Kingdom (1917)
 The Raggedy Queen (1917)
 Wrath (1917)
 The Seventh Sin (1917)
 The Girl by the Roadside (1917)
 Beyond the Law (1918)
 The Black Gate (1919)

References

External links
 

Silent film directors
Thanhouser Company
1868 births
1920 deaths
Film directors from Minnesota